The Ministry of Veteran Affairs was a department of the Namibian government, responsible for the social and economic support of veterans of the Namibian war of independence, and for the custody of Namibian independence war history. It was established in 2006. The first veteran affairs minister was Ngarikutuke Tjiriange, until then minister without portfolio.

The ministry was disbanded in 2015; The portfolio of veteran affairs fell to the office of the vice-president. In 2020 veteran affairs were added to the Ministry of Defence which was renamed Ministry of Defence and Veteran Affairs (MODVA). The  defence and veteran affairs minister is Frans Kapofi.

Ministers
All veteran affairs ministers in chronological order are:

See also
 History of Namibia

References

Veteran affairs
South African Border War
2005 establishments in Namibia
2015 disestablishments in Namibia